Magani is a surname. Notable people with the surname include:

Artur Magani (born 1994), Albanian footballer, son of Gugash and brother of Endrien
Endrien Magani (born 1991), Albanian footballer
Gugash Magani (born 1965), Albanian footballer and manager